Steine is a village in the municipality of Kvam in Vestland county, Norway.  It is located in the Steinsdalen valley which runs from the Kvamskogen area to the outskirts of the large village of Norheimsund. Norwegian County Road 7 runs through Steine.  The Steinsdalsfossen waterfall is a notable tourist attraction in the village.

References

Kvam
Villages in Vestland